This is a list of all sites designated under the Protection of Wrecks Act 1973. The designated sites are shown on charts and notified to mariners. English Heritage provides administration of the arrangements under the Act in England and publishes information on each site. In May 2011, it launched an online searchable database of all protected wreck sites in English territorial waters, the National Heritage List for England, which includes the location co-ordinates, designation list entry description and brief historical details for each site. The administration of designated historic wrecks in Scotland is managed by Historic Environment Scotland, and in Wales by Cadw.

List of designations under section 1 of the Protection of Wrecks Act (1973)

De-designations (Section 1)

List of designations under section 2 of the Protection of Wrecks Act (1973)
Section 2 of the Act designates wrecks categorised as dangerous.

De-designations (Section 2)

Notes and references

Notes on Section 1 designations
 References are to the designation order and explanatory note. All statutory instruments since 1987 are available on-line from the Office of Public Sector Information. A concatenation of designation orders including those made between 1973 and 1987 is available on the UNESCO law database site
 Cattewater: first wrecksite to be designated on 5 September 1973
 Mary Rose: designated 5 February 1974
 Grace Dieu: designated 5 February 1974, redesignated 21 July 2016:-

 Amsterdam: designated 5 February 1974
 Royal Yacht Mary: designated 5 February 1974
 HMS Assurance and HMS Pomone, Needles Wrecksite: first designated 11 April 1974, revised 8 July 1997:-
amended 29 July 1998:-

 HMS Dartmouth: first designated 11 April 1974, the original designation was revoked after excavation and recovery of finds. The site was redesignated on 25 June 1992:-
 HMS Anne: first designated 20 June 1974, redesignated 23 March 1992 and 2 Sep 2009:-

 Tearing Ledge: designated 13 March 1975
 HMS Colossus: designated 12 May 1975, revoked 1984, after it was believed that all material had been recovered, but note that the stern was discovered later at a different position and has been separately designated (designated site number 53)
 Rill Cove Wreck: designated 15 March 1976
 Rhinns of Islay: designated 1 June 1976; revoked 1984, after determination that the site is the location of multiple wrecks, and there was no longer any wreck left worth protecting.
 South Edinburgh Channel Wreck: designated 27 May 1977
 Church Rocks Wreck: designated 12 August 1977
 Pwll Fanog Wreck: first designated 14 February 1978, redesignated 19 January 1979
 Moor Sands: designated 8 March 1978
 Coronation (No 1): The offshore site was designated 31 March 1978
 Langdon Bay: designated 26 May 1978
 Kennemerland: designated 1 June 1978
 Tal-Y-Bont wreck: first designated 12 January 1979, redesignated 28 September 1989:-
 Stirling Castle: first designated 6 June 1980. Amended, along with other wrecks on the Goodwin Sands 5 October 2004:-
 Explanatory note to order 2004 No. 2395
 Invincible: designated 30 September 1980
 Bartholomew Ledges: first designated 3 October 1980. Amended 2006:-
 Restoration: first designated, along with other wrecks on the Goodwin Sands, 7 July 1981, amended 8 December 1989

amended 5 October 2004:-
 Explanatory note to order 2004 No. 2395
 Northumberland: first designated, along with other wrecks on the Goodwin Sands, 7 July 1981 (S.I. 1981/827), amended 8 December 1989

amended 5 October 2004:-
 Explanatory note to order 2004 No. 2395
 St Anthony: first designated 15 February 1982, amended 21 September 2006:-
 Schiedam: designated 15 February 1982
 Brighton Marina: designated 18 October 1983, revoked 18 August 2017. The designation was deemed no longer appropriate because recent investigations indicated that the protected area only contained a debris trail from a wreck site outside the protected area, and that the debris trail was no longer present.

  Yarmouth Roads: first designated 11 April 1984, amended 1 January 1985
 Studland Bay: first designated 27 November 1984, amended 14 December 1988:-

amended 10 August 1998
 Admiral Gardner: first designated 3 June 1985, however the designation was challenged on the grounds that it lay outside the UK's 3 mile limit.
Following the extension of the UK's territorial waters to 12 miles, the wrecksite was redesignated 3 January 1990

and amended 5 October 2004:-
 Explanatory note to order 2004 No. 2395
22 September Hazardous: first designated 1986 amended 18 March 1988 and redesignated 18 August 2017. Coordinates amended 6 June 2022:-

  Coronation (no. 2): designated 3 January 1989:-

: Iona II: first designated 3 January 1990:-

amended 7 June 2006:-
 Explanatory note to order 2006 No. 1468
The first attempt at amendment in 2006, Statutory Instrument 2006 No. 1340 was incorrect and revoked
 Gull Rock: designated 14 March 1990:-
 Wrangles Palais: first designated 18 August 1990:-
 
amended 10 January 1991:-
 Erme Estuary: designated 3 May 1991:-
 
 Smalls Reef: first designated 5 December 1991:-
amended 9 October 1995:-
 
 Duart Point: designated 15 May 1992
 Girona: designated 22 April 1993
 
 Royal Anne Galley: first designated 11 November 1993
amended 7 June 2006
 
The first attempt at amendment in 2006, Statutory Instrument 2006 No. 1342 was incorrect and revoked
 Erme Ingot: designated 26 November 1993
 Dunwich Bank: first designated 14 July 1994
 
amended 5 October 2004
 Resurgam: designated 4 July 1996
 
 Hanover: designated 19 July 1997, revoked and redesignated 2 June 2022 to amend coordinates

 Seaton Carew: designated 8 August 1997
 
 Salcombe Cannon: designated 24 October 1997
 HMS A1: first designated 26 November 1998
 
amended 5 October 2004
 Burntisland: designated 22 February 1999
 
 Loe Bar: designated 14 June 1999
 Mingary Castle: designated 19 August 2000
 
 Kinlochbervie: designated 29 June 2001
 Colossus (Stern): designated 4 July 2001, redesignated 18 August 2017, revoked and redesignated 6 September 2017 to amend coordinates
 

 HMS Campania: designated 1 December 2001
 The Diamond: designated 2 April 2002, the first such designation under devolved powers by the National Assembly for Wales
 Bonhomme Richard: designated 18 July 2002
 
 Swash Channel: designated 10 December 2004
 Holland V: designated 4 January 2005
 
 West Bay: designated 19 July 2005
 Resolution: designated 14 June 2006
 
 Rooswijk: designated 18 January 2007, redesignated 23 February 2018

 Wheel Wreck: designated 5 April 2007
 
 HMS London: designated 24 October 2008, redesignated 31 July 2012:-

 Goodwin and Downs 8: designated 3 August 2012:-

 Unknown wooden sailing vessel: designated 31 July 2013:-

 Association: designated 21 March 2014:-

 HMS A3: designated 21 July 2016:-

  SM U-8: designated 21 July 2016:-

 Holigost: designated 21 July 2016:-

 HMT Arfon: designated 16 August 2016:-

 Chesil Beach cannon: designated 18 August 2017:-

 UC-70: designated 18 August 2017:-

 Unknown vessel: designated 5 July 2019:-

 Shingles Bank Wreck NW68: designated 2 June 2022:-

 Shingles Bank Wreck NW96: designated 2 June 2022:-

 Mortar Wreck: designated 2 June 2022:-

Notes on Responsible Authorities
 Management of Protected wrecksites designated under section 1 of the Act is devolved to the National Curators of the devolved nations of the United Kingdom. Management of wrecks designated under section 2 is the responsibility of the Maritime and Coastguard Agency
 "Protected Wreck Sites" Historic England website. Retrieved 7 October 2020 See also Historic England
  See also Cadw
 See Historic Environment Scotland, formerly Historic Scotland
 See Environment and Heritage Service (of Northern Ireland)
  See also Maritime and Coastguard Agency

Notes on identification of wrecksites and dating
 HMS Assurance: the Advisory Committee on Historic Wreck originally identified the sinking as 1738, however investigation by a former licensee into historic records dated the loss as 1753, and this is shown as the date of sinking in the site summary of the wrecksite in Appendix A(ii) of the latest report, although Appendix A(iii), The list of current designated sites, still shows the date as 1738.
 Tearing Ledge The wreck is believed to be the Romney, one of four ships lost on 22 October 1707
 Rill Cove Wreck: the identity of the wreck has not been determined. The tentative date of 1616 is based on the dates of artefacts recovered.
 Coronation: the wreck of the Coronation is thought to be split into two sites - the Kennemerland also split into two sites when wrecked. The identity of the offshore site (site 17) was confirmed by finding a plate inscribed with the family crest of the Captain. The identity of the inshore site (site 33) is more controversial. Royal Naval Guns found on the inshore site are consistent with a first or second rate ship of the line of the correct period and there is no other record of a ship of her size foundering in the area.
 Barthomolew Ledges: it is possible that the wreck is that of the Spanish vessel, San Bartholome which was wrecked in 1597, although this vessel is not recorded as being lost in the Isles of Scilly. The wreck is late 16th century and was carrying lead ingots of a Spanish type. Six recovered coins date between 1474 and 1555, hence dating the wreck after 1555.
 The Diamond: the wreck is of an early type of composite hull and was initially thought to be the Diamond. The current licensee has identified several anomalies in this identification, including that the wreck appears to be longer than the Diamond; there are discrepancies between samples of materials recovered from the wreck and those listed as being used in the construction of the Diamond, and artefacts patented after the date of sinking have been recovered.

Notes on Section 2 designations
 References are to the designation order and explanatory note, where available (since 1987) on-line from the Office of Public Sector Information
 Richard Montgomery: designated 31 October 1973, because of the presence of a large amount of munitions
 
 MV Braer (oil tanker): designated 8 February 1993 because of the presence of a significant amount of oil.
revoked 7 October 1994
 
 Castilian: designated 13 August 1997

References

External links
 National Heritage List for England: English Heritage

Archaeology of shipwrecks
Underwater archaeology
 
Shipwreck law
Ships of the United Kingdom
Archaeology-related lists